The men's kumite 75 kilograms competition at the 2018 Asian Games took place on 27 August 2018 at Jakarta Convention Center Plenary Hall, Jakarta, Indonesia.

Schedule
All times are Western Indonesia Time (UTC+07:00)

Results 
Legend
H — Won by hansoku (8–0)
K — Won by kiken (8–0)

Main bracket

Final

Top half

Bottom half

Repechage

References

External links
Official website

Karate at the 2018 Asian Games